The Congregation of the Daughters of Our Lady of the Sacred Heart is a Roman Catholic religious institute founded on 30 August 1874 by Servant of God Jules Chevalier (1824-1907), the Founder of the Missionaries of the Sacred Heart.  From the Latin form of its name, Filiae Dominae Nostrae Sacro Corde, it takes the abbreviation FDNSC. The order has an orientation towards missionary work. It is one of the members of the Chevalier Family group.

The order has been active in Papua New Guinea with spiritual and health work. The Daughters have also worked in Australia, where they founded and run girls' secondary college Our Lady of the Sacred Heart College, Sydney, along with two other schools of the same name in Melbourne and Adelaide. There are convents located in Melbourne (VIC), Sydney (NSW) and Bowral (NSW). The convent in Bowral, Hartzer Park, now also functions as a conference centre and retreat.

References

Catholic missionary orders
Religious organizations established in 1874
Catholic female orders and societies
1874 establishments in France